The 2001 MAAC Men's Ice Hockey Tournament was the 3rd championship in the history of the conference. It was played between March 10 and March 17, 2001. Quarterfinal games were played at home team campus sites, while the final four games were played at the UConn Ice Arena in Storrs, Connecticut, the home venue of the Connecticut Huskies. By winning the tournament, Mercyhurst received MAAC's automatic bid to the 2001 NCAA Men's Division I Ice Hockey Tournament.

Format
The tournament featured three rounds of play with each round being single-elimination. The teams that finish below eighth in the standings are ineligible for tournament play. In the first round, the first and eighth seeds, the second and seventh seeds, the third seed and sixth seeds, and the fourth seed and fifth seeds played with the winner advancing to the semifinals. In the semifinals, the highest and lowest seeds and second highest and second lowest seeds play with the winner advancing to the championship game.  The tournament champion receives an automatic bid to the 2001 NCAA Men's Division I Ice Hockey Tournament.

Conference standings
Note: GP = Games played; W = Wins; L = Losses; T = Ties; PTS = Points; GF = Goals For; GA = Goals Against

Bracket

Teams are reseeded after the quarterfinals

Note: * denotes overtime period(s)

Quarterfinals

(1) Mercyhurst vs. (8) Fairfield

(2) Quinnipiac vs. (7) Army

(3) Iona vs. (6) Sacred Heart

(4) Canisius vs. (5) Connecticut

Semifinals

(1) Mercyhurst vs. (4) Canisius

(2) Quinnipiac vs. (3) Iona

Championship

(1) Mercyhurst vs. (2) Quinnipiac

Tournament awards

All-Tournament Team
F Jeff Gould* (Mercyhurst)
F Mike Carter (Mercyhurst)
F 
D Jody Robinson (Mercyhurst)
D 
G Peter Aubrey (Mercyhurst)
* Most Valuable Player(s)

References

MAAC Men's Ice Hockey Tournament
MAAC Men's Ice Hockey Tournament